Władysław Zajączkowski (April 12, 1837 in Strzyżów near the Rzeszów – October 7, 1898 in Lwów) was a Polish mathematician. Professor of Warsaw Main School, Imperial University of Warsaw (now University of Warsaw), Technical Academy in Lviv (now Lviv Polytechnic; twice a rector). Member of Polish Academy of Learning and French Academy of Sciences. He was specialising mainly in mathematical analysis and differential equations.

References

1837 births
1898 deaths
Polish mathematicians
Lviv Polytechnic rectors